William T. Britton (12 October 1890 – 15 February 1965) was an Irish athlete.

Early life

Britton was born near Mullinahone to a farming family. He attended Coláiste Éamann Rís in Callan and worked as a bank clerk in the Munster and Leinster Bank.

Career
Britton excelled in high jump, long jump, 120 yd hurdles, triple jump and hammer throw, winning Gaelic Athletic Association, National Athletic and Cycling Association and Amateur Athletic Association of England titles.

The high point of Britton's career was representing Ireland at the 1930 British Empire Games in Hamilton, Canada, where he won silver in the hammer throw with a throw of 153′ 10″ (46.89 m).

References

1890 births
1965 deaths
Irish male hammer throwers
Irish male long jumpers
Irish male high jumpers
Irish male hurdlers
Irish male sprinters
Sportspeople from County Tipperary
Commonwealth Games medallists in athletics
Athletes (track and field) at the 1930 British Empire Games
Commonwealth Games silver medallists
Medallists at the 1930 British Empire Games